"Learning to Fly" is a song by the English progressive rock band Pink Floyd, written by David Gilmour, Anthony Moore, Bob Ezrin, and Jon Carin. It was the first single from the band's thirteenth studio album A Momentary Lapse of Reason. It reached number 70 on the U.S. Billboard Hot 100 chart and number 1 on the Billboard Album Rock Tracks chart in September, 1987, remaining three consecutive weeks at the top position in the autumn of the same year. Meanwhile, the song failed to chart on the official U.K. top 40 singles charts. On the other hand, in Spain, the song peaked at number 1 on the Los 40 Principales chart.

Background
The song was primarily written by David Gilmour, who developed the music from a 1986 demo by Jon Carin, while the lyrics were written by Anthony Moore. The notable rhythm pattern at the beginning of the song was already present in the demo, and Carin stated that it was influenced by Steve Jansen or Yukihiro Takahashi.

The inspiration for the lyrics came about as Gilmour was learning to fly airplanes at the time of the recording, often spending time in the air during the mornings before arriving at the studio in the afternoon. It has also been interpreted as a metaphor for beginning something new, experiencing a radical change in life, or, more specifically, Gilmour's feelings about striking out as the new leader of Pink Floyd after the departure of Roger Waters. Gilmour stated on Westwood One's Pink Floyd 25th Anniversary Special in 1992 that "we were, as Pink Floyd, learning to fly again." Also an avid pilot, drummer Nick Mason's voice can be heard at around the middle of the song. "Learning to Fly" was included on Pink Floyd's greatest hits collection Echoes: The Best of Pink Floyd.

The track was regularly performed live on the band's two post-Roger Waters tours, with touring guitarist Tim Renwick playing the song's guitar solos (although David Gilmour played the solos on the studio version of the track). A live version is included on Delicate Sound of Thunder and Pulse. At the end of the final solo in both versions, a guitar lick from the second verse of "Young Lust" ("Oooh, baby set me free") is played.

Music video
The music video was directed by Storm Thorgerson, a longtime collaborator of Pink Floyd who had designed many of their album covers, and filmed on West Wind Ridge, a mountain in Kananaskis Country near Canmore, located some 50 to 75 km west of the city of Calgary, Alberta during rehearsals for the band's A Momentary Lapse of Reason Tour. The video combined performances of the band with an Indigenous person, played by Canadian actor Lawrence Bayne, working in a field who then runs and jumps off a cliff to turn into a red-tailed hawk. The footage of the stage show shows the band performing "Learning to Fly" but features the more colourful light-show used for live performances of "One of These Days". The red/orange airplane is a Beech Model 17 Staggerwing.

The original video also depicts a factory worker who turns into an aeroplane pilot as well as a child who breaks free from his mother and dives off a cliff into a deep river, swimming away.

The video went to No. 9 on MTV's Video Countdown in November 1987 and was the No. 60 video of MTV's Top 100 Videos of 1987. The video won the band its only MTV Video Music Award for "Best Concept Video" in 1988.

Personnel
Pink Floyd
David Gilmour – lead and backing vocals, electric guitar, sequencer
Nick Mason – drums, spoken words, sound effects

Additional musicians:

Richard Wright – keyboards, backing vocals
Jon Carin – keyboards
Bob Ezrin – sequencer, percussion
Tony Levin – bass guitar
Steve Forman – percussion
Darlene Koldenhoven – backing vocals
Carmen Twillie – backing vocals
Phyllis St. James – backing vocals
Donny Gerrard – backing vocals

Charts

See also
List of number-one mainstream rock hits (United States)

References

External links

1987 singles
Pink Floyd songs
Songs written by David Gilmour
Songs written by Bob Ezrin
Song recordings produced by Bob Ezrin
Song recordings produced by David Gilmour
Columbia Records singles
EMI Records singles